Krypy  is a village in the administrative district , in east-central Poland

References

Krypy